Ponnani Lok Sabha constituency is one of the 20 Lok Sabha (parliamentary) constituencies in Kerala state in southern India.

Assembly segments
Ponnani Lok Sabha constituency is composed of the following assembly segments:

Members of Parliament

Election results

2019
There were  registered voters in Ponnani Constituency for the 2019 Lok Sabha Election.

2014

2009

2004

1999

1998

1996

1991

1989

1984

1980

1977

See also
 Malappuram district
 List of Constituencies of the Lok Sabha
 2019 Indian general election in Kerala

References

External links
 Election Commission of India: https://web.archive.org/web/20081218010942/http://www.eci.gov.in/StatisticalReports/ElectionStatistics.asp

Lok Sabha constituencies in Kerala
Politics of Malappuram district